Winners Get Lost is a 1951 novel by Al Perry, which was re-issued in 1964 by Arizona Silhouettes.  It received positive reviews in the Democrat and Chronicle, The Tampa Tribune, The Gazette, the Fairbanks Daily News-Miner, and The Charlotte Observer.<ref>{{cite news|title='Winners Get Lost Delightful Reading |url=https://www.newspapers.com/clip/110238969/ |newspaper=The Charlotte Observer |date=February 11, 1951 |page=69 |via = Newspapers.com|access-date = September 26, 2022}}</ref>  After the 1964 re-issue, it got several more positive reviews from the Arizona Daily Star and the Arizona Republic''.

References

1951 novels
1964 novels